In mathematics and computational science, the Euler method (also called the forward Euler method) is a first-order numerical procedure for solving ordinary differential equations (ODEs) with a given initial value. It is the most basic explicit method for numerical integration of ordinary differential equations and is the simplest Runge–Kutta method. The Euler method is named after Leonhard Euler, who first proposed it in his book Institutionum calculi integralis (published 1768–1870).

The Euler method is a first-order method, which means that the local error (error per step) is proportional to the square of the step size, and the global error (error at a given time) is proportional to the step size. 
The Euler method often serves as the basis to construct more complex methods, e.g., predictor–corrector method.

Geometrical description

Purpose and why it works 
Consider the problem of calculating the shape of an unknown curve which starts at a given point and satisfies a given differential equation. Here, a differential equation can be thought of as a formula by which the slope of the tangent line to the curve can be computed at any point on the curve, once the position of that point has been calculated.

Then, from the differential equation, the slope to the curve at  can be computed, and so, the tangent line.

Take a small step along that tangent line  up to a point  Along this small step, the slope does not change too much, so  will be close to the curve. After several steps, a polygonal curve is computed. In general, this curve does not diverge too far from the original unknown curve, and the error between the two curves can be made small if the step size is small enough and the interval of computation is finite.

First-order process 
Begin the process by setting . Next, choose a value  for the size of every step and set  (or equivalently ).

Higher-order process 
While the Euler method integrates a first-order ODE, any ODE of order  can be represented as a system of first-order ODEs. When given the ODE of order  defined as

we implement the following formula until we reach the approximation of the solution to the ODE at the desired time:

These first-order systems can be handled by Euler's method or, in fact, by any other scheme for first-order systems.

Example
Given the initial value problem

we would like to use the Euler method to approximate .

Using step size equal to 1 

The Euler method is

so first we must compute . We have

By doing the above step, we have found the slope of the line that is tangent to the solution curve at the point .

The next step is to multiply the above value by the step size , which we take equal to one here:

This value is then added to the initial  value to obtain the next value to be used for computations.

 

Due to the repetitive nature of this algorithm, it can be helpful to organize computations in a chart form, as seen below, to avoid making errors.

{| class="wikitable"
|-
!  !!  !!  !! !!  !!  !! 
|-
| 0 || 1 || 0 || 1 || 1 || 1 || 2
|-
| 1 || 2 || 1 || 2 || 1 || 2 || 4
|-
| 2 || 4 || 2 || 4 || 1 || 4 || 8
|-
| 3 || 8 || 3 || 8 || 1 || 8 || 16
|}

The conclusion of this computation is that . Although the approximation of the Euler method was not very precise in this specific case, particularly due to a large value step size , its behaviour is qualitatively correct as the figure shows.

Using other step sizes 

As suggested in the introduction, the Euler method is more accurate if the step size  is smaller. The table below shows the result with different step sizes. The top row corresponds to the example in the previous section, and the second row is illustrated in the figure.

{| class="wikitable"
|-
! step size !! result of Euler's method !! error
|-
| 1 || 16.00 || 38.60
|-
| 0.25 || 35.53 || 19.07
|-
| 0.1 || 45.26 || 9.34
|-
| 0.05 || 49.56 || 5.04
|-
| 0.025 || 51.98 || 2.62
|-
| 0.0125 || 53.26 || 1.34
|}

In the bottom of the table, the step size is half the step size in the previous row, and the error is also approximately half the error in the previous row. This suggests that the error is roughly proportional to the step size, at least for fairly small values of the step size. This is true in general, also for other equations; see the section Global truncation error for more details.

Other methods, such as the midpoint method also illustrated in the figures, behave more favourably: the global error of the midpoint method is roughly proportional to the square of the step size. For this reason, the Euler method is said to be a first-order method, while the midpoint method is second order.

We can extrapolate from the above table that the step size needed to get an answer that is correct to three decimal places is approximately 0.00001, meaning that we need 400,000 steps. This large number of steps entails a high computational cost. For this reason, higher-order methods are employed such as Runge–Kutta methods or linear multistep methods, especially if a high accuracy is desired.

Derivation

The Euler method can be derived in a number of ways. Firstly, there is the geometrical description above.

Another possibility is to consider the Taylor expansion of the function  around :

The differential equation states that . If this is substituted in the Taylor expansion and the quadratic and higher-order terms are ignored, the Euler method arises. The Taylor expansion is used below to analyze the error committed by the Euler method, and it can be extended to produce Runge–Kutta methods.

A closely related derivation is to substitute the forward finite difference formula for the derivative,

in the differential equation . Again, this yields the Euler method. A similar computation leads to the midpoint method and the backward Euler method.

Now approximate the integral by the left-hand rectangle method (with only one rectangle):

Combining both equations, one finds again the Euler method. This line of thought can be continued to arrive at various linear multistep methods.

Local truncation error
The local truncation error of the Euler method is the error made in a single step. It is the difference between the numerical solution after one step, and the exact solution at time . The numerical solution is given by

For the exact solution, we use the Taylor expansion mentioned in the section Derivation above:

The local truncation error (LTE) introduced by the Euler method is given by the difference between these equations:

This result is valid if  has a bounded third derivative.

This makes the Euler method less accurate (for small ) than other higher-order techniques such as Runge-Kutta methods and linear multistep methods, for which the local truncation error is proportional to a higher power of the step size.

A slightly different formulation for the local truncation error can be obtained by using the Lagrange form for the remainder term in Taylor's theorem. If  has a continuous second derivative, then there exists a  such that

In the above expressions for the error, the second derivative of the unknown exact solution  can be replaced by an expression involving the right-hand side of the differential equation. Indeed, it follows from the equation  that

Global truncation error
The global truncation error is the error at a fixed time , after however many steps the method needs to take to reach that time from the initial time. The global truncation error is the cumulative effect of the local truncation errors committed in each step.

This intuitive reasoning can be made precise.

Or more simply, when , the value  (such that  is treated as a constant). In contrast,  where function  is the exact solution which only contains the  variable.

The precise form of this bound is of little practical importance, as in most cases the bound vastly overestimates the actual error committed by the Euler method. For this reason, the Euler method is said to be first order.

Numerical stability

The Euler method can also be numerically unstable, especially for stiff equations, meaning that the numerical solution grows very large for equations where the exact solution does not. This can be illustrated using the linear equation

However, if the Euler method is applied to this equation with step size , then the numerical solution is qualitatively wrong: It oscillates and grows (see the figure). This is what it means to be unstable. If a smaller step size is used, for instance , then the numerical solution does decay to zero.

If the Euler method is applied to the linear equation , then the numerical solution is unstable if the product  is outside the region

illustrated on the right. This region is called the (linear) stability region. In the example, so if  then  which is outside the stability region, and thus the numerical solution is unstable.

This limitation — along with its slow convergence of error with  — means that the Euler method is not often used, except as a simple example of numerical integration.

Rounding errors
In step  of the Euler method, the rounding error is roughly of the magnitude  where  is the machine epsilon. Thus, for extremely small values of the step size the truncation error will be small but the effect of rounding error may be big. Most of the effect of rounding error can be easily avoided if compensated summation is used in the formula for the Euler method.

Modifications and extensions
A simple modification of the Euler method which eliminates the stability problems noted above is the backward Euler method:

This differs from the (standard, or forward) Euler method in that the function  is evaluated at the end point of the step, instead of the starting point. The backward Euler method is an implicit method, meaning that the formula for the backward Euler method has  on both sides, so when applying the backward Euler method we have to solve an equation. This makes the implementation more costly.

Other modifications of the Euler method that help with stability yield the exponential Euler method or the semi-implicit Euler method.

More complicated methods can achieve a higher order (and more accuracy). One possibility is to use more function evaluations. This is illustrated by the midpoint method which is already mentioned in this article:
.
This leads to the family of Runge–Kutta methods.

The other possibility is to use more past values, as illustrated by the two-step Adams–Bashforth method:

This leads to the family of linear multistep methods. There are other modifications which uses techniques from compressive sensing to minimize memory usage

In popular culture
In the film Hidden Figures, Katherine Goble resorts to the Euler method in calculating the re-entry of astronaut John Glenn from Earth orbit.

See also
Crank–Nicolson method
Gradient descent similarly uses finite steps, here to find minima of functions
List of Runge-Kutta methods
Linear multistep method
Numerical integration (for calculating definite integrals)
Numerical methods for ordinary differential equations

Notes

References

External links 

 
 Euler method implementations in different languages by Rosetta Code
 

Numerical differential equations
Runge–Kutta methods
First order methods
Leonhard Euler
Articles with example R code
Articles with example MATLAB/Octave code